The Udi-Nsukka Plateau is a pair of nearly connected plateaus located in south central Nigeria.  Coal was discovered there in 1909.  Igbo people make up the largest group in the south, and Igala people in the north.  The town of Ankpa is located on the plateau.

See also
Nsukka
Enugu
Okigwi

Plateaus of Africa
Landforms of Nigeria
Enugu
Enugu State